Aya is a 2012 French-Israeli short drama film directed by  and Mihal Brezis. The film was nominated for the Academy Award for Best Live Action Short Film at the 87th Academy Awards, but did not win.

Plot
Aya is waiting for someone at Ben Gurion International Airport. A driver asks her to hold his welcome sign for Mr. Overby, who is flying into Israel to judge the Arthur Rubinstein piano competition. When the Danish juror shows up, Aya decides on an impulse to drive him to his hotel in Jerusalem. During the car ride, an unexpected intimacy develops between Aya and the reserved Overby.

Cast
 Sarah Adler as Aya
 Ulrich Thomsen as Mr. Overby

References

External links
 
 
 

2012 drama films
2012 films
Films set in Israel
English-language French films
English-language Israeli films
French drama short films
Israeli drama films
Israeli short films
2012 short films
2010s English-language films
2012 multilingual films
French multilingual films
Israeli multilingual films
2010s French films